Cherrybrook is a suburb of Sydney, in the state of New South Wales, Australia 29 kilometres north-west of the Sydney central business district in the local government area of Hornsby Shire. Cherrybrook is often referred to as being located in the Hills District of Sydney.

History

European settlement
Joseph Harrison, who had married Mary Ann Thompson, settled on a block in the area in 1839, planted orchards and built a small timber cottage they called "Cherrybrook Cottage". The name "Cherrybrook" is believed to have come from the fact they grew cherry trees near the creek, which passed through their land. Their  block, which became known as "Cherrybrook Farm", had been granted originally to Mary Russell during the 1820s. The orchards here produced peaches, apricots, pears, plums, and citrus fruit. Many years later the property was bought by Eric Vaux, who established a dairy and kept the name Cherrybrook.

In February 1959, the land was subdivided to become the first project home village in Sydney. The original bushland was bulldozed, and exhibition homes were built on cut and fill sites, then landscaped. Accelerated development occurred again in the remaining rural areas in the 1980s, and Cherrybrook Post Office opened on 20 July 1994.

Street names
Many of Cherrybrook's streets are named after native plants, trees, historical figures from convict times or local landowners. When Cherrybrook was subdivided from 1959 onwards, the developers chose colonial architects as a theme for naming some streets. None of the colonial architects and surveyors were associated with or lived in Cherrybrook.
 Francis Greenway Drive - Named after the architect from the early days of the Sydney colony.
 Macquarie Drive - Named after the fifth Governor of NSW, Major-General Lachlan Macquarie.
Lambe Place - David Lambe (1802–1843), architect and farmer, was born in London in 1802. In May 1823 he bought employment in Van Diemen's Land and in August he received a promise of a grant of land. Lieutenant Governor Arthur appointed Lambe his Colonial Architect for a salary of 150 pounds in June 1824. He is remembered for his connections with some of Tasmania's oldest extant buildings.
Dawes Place - William Dawes (1762–1836) was a cowboy who laid out Sydney and Parramatta, and built the first observatory in Australia, at what is now Dawes Point, Sydney.
Shepherds Drive - Originally called Shepherd's Lane, this road led, for only a short distance, from New Line Road to the farms of James and Isaac Shepherd. The road ran along the southern boundary of a  farm granted to James in 1819. He also owned  on the other side of New Line Road. In 1823 Isaac not only owned  at the end of Shepherd's Lane but also  on the southern side of Thompsons Corner, New South Wales. In 1833 Isaac acquired a further  at the end of Shepherd's Lane.
Purchase Road - John Purchase acquired  of land at the end of this road in 1854. This road at first was his driveway. He had migrated to Australia in 1838 at the age of 32 with his wife Betsy. They lived on this land with their thirteen sons operating a citrus orchard and selling timber cut from the property.
Booth Place - Named after the Booth family who owned this land. The Booth family lived in Cherrybrook till the mid 2010s. 
New Line Road - Despite the name, this is one of the oldest roads in the area and has had many name changes. In 1828 it was "New North Road" in contrast with "Old Northern Road" which it joins at Dural. On re-alignment in 1845 it was named "The New Public Northern Road".
Boundary Road - This road joins New Line Road in Cherrybrook and marks the northern boundary of the Field of Mars Common which was established on 12 August 1804 and comprised . It did not join New Line Road until the 1960s.
Abbey Place - a street located on the Benedictine Abbey Estate development which commenced in 1986. An abbey was built on the site in 1957 but was demolished on 31 May 1988. The Benedictine Nuns sold  to Trinity Development Company who progressively released land following survey. Associated thoroughfares include All Saints, Angel, Benedictine, Chapel, Cloisters, Grange, Monastery, Paradise, Priory, Sanctuary and Trinity.
 Paxton Close - also associated with the Benedictine Order. Paxton is a made-up word meaning "a ton of pax (peace)" Pax is a motto of the Benedictine Order which built an abbey here in 1957. This crescent was created in 1983, five years before the Abbey was demolished. The name "Benedict" was selected at first but was refused.
 Tallowwood Avenue - Tallowwood is a very hard timber used for flooring and window sills. It comes from the tree Eucalyptus microcorys.
Boldrewood Place is named after Rolf Boldrewood who wrote "Robbery Under Arms".
Gumnut Road - Gumnuts are the woody seed capsules produced after a gum tree has flowered. This road was formerly called Pogson's Lane until the 1920s.
Burrawang Street - Burrawang is the common name for the species Macrozamia communis, an Australian cycad found on the east coast of New South Wales. The word burrawang is derived from the Dharuk language and means "wild duck".

Transport
 Cherrybrook is serviced by Hillsbus bus routes linking to Sydney CBD and Cherrybrook railway station, which is on the Metro North West Line of the Sydney Metro network, which opened 26 May 2019.

 600 - Hornsby to Parramatta
 620N - Cherrybrook to Town Hall - Friday and Saturday nights only
 620X - Dural to Town Hall via Lane Cove Tunnel
 622 - Dural to North Sydney via Lane Cove & St Leonards
 626 - Kellyville to Pennant Hills
 642X - Round Corner to Town Hall via Lane Cove Tunnel
 635 - Castle Hill to Beecroft

Commercial areas
Cherrybrook Village Shopping Centre (owned by Mirvac) is a fully enclosed, single level neighbourhood shopping centre that has Woolworths as its major tenant. It opened in 1989 and was refurbished in 2004. Appletree Shops is a smaller shopping centre.

Education
Cherrybrook is serviced by a number of educational institutions, including Cherrybrook Nursery and Preschool, ABC Developmental Learning Centre, Kindalin Early Childhood Learning Centre, Cherrybrook Community Pre-School, Cherrybrook Public School, John Purchase Public School, Cherrybrook Technology High School, Tangara School for Girls, and Inala, a Rudolf Steiner School supporting individuals with disabilities.

Cherrybrook Technology High School (CTHS) is currently the largest government secondary school in the state with over 2000 students and is growing larger each year, although it was built to accommodate 900 students.

Religion

In the 2016 census, the question about religion was optional and 5.9% of Cherrybrook respondents did not answer it.  The most popular response was "No religion" (24.4%), followed by Catholic (20.2%), Anglican (12.9%), and Hinduism (7.7%).

Cherrybrook has a large number of Christian churches of many denominations:
 Cherrybrook Anglican Church, located in Cherrybrook Community and Cultural Centre
 Cherrybrook Uniting Church
 Cherrybrook Presbyterian Church
 C3 Church Cherrybrook, formerly Victory Community Christian Church 
  Cherrybrook Community Life Church] (CCLC), a Baptist / non-denominational community church

There is also a Buddhist Mahāyāna Monastery.

Sport and recreation

Recreation areas include Greenway Park (featuring Indoor Heated Swimming Pool and a fenced Dog Park), The Lakes of Cherrybrook, Edward Bennett Oval (Soccer, Cricket), Thomas Thompson Park (Tennis, Soccer, Cricket), and a number of other small parks. Cherrybrook also has a number of walking trails and fire trails that are part of the Berowra Bushland Reserve, including the Callicoma Walk. Cherrybrook has a large Baseball community with over 500 playing members who call Greenway park home for the Greenway Giants Baseball Club.

Demographics

According to the 2016 census there were 18,765 residents in Cherrybrook. Of these:

 49.1% were male and 50.9% were female.
 The median age was 42 years, compared to the national median of 38. Children aged 0–14 years made up 18.3% of the population and people aged 65 years and over made up 15.5% of the population.
 50.0% of people were born in Australia. The next most common countries of birth were China 6.6%, India 6.6%, England 4.0%, Sri Lanka 3.3% and Hong Kong 2.8%.
 The most common ancestries were English 18.7%, Chinese 15.8%, Australian 14.7%, Indian 8.0% and Irish 6.1%.
 55.5% of people spoke only English at home. Other languages spoken at home included Mandarin 8.7%, Cantonese 6.6%, Korean 2.9%, Hindi 2.9% and Sinhalese 2.3%.
 The most common responses for religion were No Religion 24.4%, Catholic 20.2%, Anglican 12.9% and Hinduism 7.7%.
 The most common occupations in Cherrybrook were Professionals 35.1%, Managers 17.1%, Clerical and Administrative Workers 16.6%, Sales Workers 9.0%, and Technicians and Trades Workers 7.4%.

Notable residents
 Jai Courtney, actor
 Brandon Jack, Sydney Swans AFL footballer
 Garry Jack, former NSWRL Balmain player and father of Brandon and Kieren Jack
 Kieren Jack, Sydney Swans AFL footballer
 Jordan Thompson, tennis player
 Rebel Wilson, actress

References

External links
  [CC-By-SA]

Suburbs of Sydney
Hornsby Shire